Fort Watauga, more properly Fort Caswell, was an American Revolutionary War fort that once stood at the Sycamore Shoals of the Watauga River in what is now Elizabethton, Tennessee.  The fort was originally built in 1775–1776 by the area's frontier government, the Watauga Association, to help defend Watauga settlers from Native American (primarily Cherokee) attacks, which were in part instigated by the British. Fort Watauga was originally named Fort Caswell after North Carolina Governor Richard Caswell.

In the 1970s, as part of the nation's bicentennial celebrations, the state of Tennessee authorized a reconstruction of Fort Watauga.  Archaeologists conducted excavations in the Sycamore Shoals area and uncovered several trenches believed to have been part of the fort's walls.  The fort was then rebuilt based on information gained about the fort's design from the excavation, descriptions of the fort in historical sources, and the general design of typical Appalachian frontier forts.  The reconstructed fort is now part of Sycamore Shoals State Historic Park.

History

Watauga settlement

In the late 1760s, Euro-American settlers began arriving in the Holston, Watauga, and Nolichucky river valleys in Southwest Virginia and what is now Northeast Tennessee.  Along the Watauga, settlers were drawn to a place known as the Watauga Old Fields, an ancient Native American gathering place that pre-dated the Cherokee.  The Old Fields consisted of flat, cleared land located along the Watauga's Sycamore Shoals, a relatively low stretch of the river where pioneers and travelers could cross with ease.  These early settlers inevitably came into conflict with the Cherokee and other Native American tribes in the region who claimed these lands as hunting grounds.  

The Royal Proclamation of 1763 and several subsequent treaties  placed the boundary of British-controlled lands at the South Fork of the Holston River, and in the early 1770s settlers outside this boundary (including the Watauga settlers) were ordered to leave.  The Watauga settlers leased their lands from the Cherokee in 1772 and purchased the lands in 1775, but these agreements still violated the 1763 Proclamation.  Furthermore, a faction of the Cherokee led by the young chief Dragging Canoe vehemently opposed the sale of tribal lands, and threatened bloodshed against the settlers.  In 1774 and 1775, both British Superintendent of Indian Affairs John Stuart and North Carolina governor Josiah Martin issued repeated calls for settlers south of the Holston to leave Cherokee lands.

July 1776 Cherokee invasion

The outbreak of the American Revolutionary War in 1775 further agitated the tense situation on the Appalachian frontier.  The Watauga and Nolichucky settlers generally supported separation from Britain, and formed a Committee of Safety, and founded the "Washington District."  In January 1776, Dragging Canoe and the British forged an alliance, and in April of that year the British supplied the Cherokee with a large cache of weapons in hopes they would wreak havoc on the colonial frontier.  Now well-armed, the Cherokee sent a message to the Watauga settlers, giving them 20 days to leave Cherokee lands or face attack.  
  
The Watauga settlers, meanwhile, had been anticipating a Cherokee invasion.  Arms and ammunition were purchased through the Fincastle County, Virginia Committee of Safety, food and medicine were gathered, and various forts were constructed or strengthened, among them Fort Caswell (now called Fort Watauga). In early July, Cherokee Beloved Woman Nancy Ward tipped off the Cherokee invasion plans to trader Isaac Thomas, and Thomas proceeded to deliver the news to John Sevier, who was at the Nolichucky settlement (near modern Limestone) overseeing the construction of Fort Lee.  The news alarmed the settlers, and most of them fled to Fort Caswell, forcing Sevier to flee likewise and abandon Fort Lee's completion.

The Cherokee invasion began in mid-July, 1776.  When the invaders reached the Nolichucky, a contingent led by a chief known as "The Raven" split off toward Carter's Valley (near modern Kingsport), where he chased away the settlers and burned their cabins and farms.  Two contingents led by Dragging Canoe and Old Abraham of Chilhowee (or Abram) proceeded up the Nolichucky where they burned the abandoned Fort Lee.  This force then split up, with Dragging Canoe marching north to attack the Holston settlements and Old Abraham marching east to attack Fort Watauga.  As Dragging Canoe approached Eaton's Station (in the vicinity of Long Island of the Holston), the fort's garrison, led by Captain John Thompson, feared the Cherokees would bypass the fort and destroy their farms, and thus marched out to engage them at Island Flats.  13 Cherokee were killed and dozens (including Dragging Canoe) were wounded, and the Cherokee force retreated.

The siege of Fort Caswell

With the Cherokee approaching, some 150 to 200 settlers crowded into Fort Caswell.  The fort's garrison consisted of roughly 75 men under the command of John Carter (the Committee of Safety commissioner), with James Robertson and John Sevier as subordinates.  Old Abraham of Chilhowee's contingent of Cherokee warriors arrived at Fort Caswell in the early morning hours of July 21.  The sudden appearance of the invaders surprised several women out milking cows, forcing them to rush to get back inside the fort.  One of them, Catherine "Bonnie Kate" Sherrill, the future wife of John Sevier, was unable to get back inside before the gate was locked and had to be pulled over the palisades by Sevier.  The initial Cherokee attack lasted about three hours, with both sides exchanging gunfire. During the attack, several Cherokees managed to get close enough to the fort to attempt to set it on fire, but were forced back after Ann Robertson Johnson (sister of James Robertson) threw scalding hot water at them.   

Unable to take the fort, the Cherokee halted the assault and settled in for a lengthy siege.  In the ensuing days, a teenager named Tom Moore was captured outside the fort and taken to Tuskegee, where he was burned at the stake.  Another captive, Lydia Russell Bean, wife of early settler William Bean, was about to meet the same fate when Nancy Ward intervened and used her authority as a Beloved Woman to spare her.  After approximately two weeks, the Cherokee lifted the siege and retreated.  The arrival of the Virginia militia under William Christian later that year largely ended the threat to the fort.

The fort in later years
In September 1780, the Overmountain Men— the frontier militia that helped defeat an army of British loyalists at the Battle of Kings Mountain— mustered at Sycamore Shoals on the grounds around Fort Watauga.  After this event, the fort largely vanished from historical records, but it still occasionally appeared in land deeds as late as 1819.  

In 1909, the Daughters of the American Revolution placed a monument near the site of the fort.  In the mid-1970s, the state of Tennessee reconstructed the fort in anticipation of the nation's 1976 bicentennial celebrations.  The state funded archaeological excavations and historical research to determine the fort's design and location.  The Watauga Historical Association, formed in the late 1950s, was instrumental in the creation of Sycamore Shoals State Historic Park.

Location and design

19th-century historian J. G. M. Ramsey provided the most often-cited description of the Fort Watauga location in his Annals of Tennessee, published in 1852.

The Ramsey location for Fort Watauga also places the stockade fort two miles further distant west from the historic homesteads of John Carter, John Sevier, and James Robertson (all who were militia leaders and defenders during the July, 1776 Cherokee siege of Fort Watauga) than does the Draper location. The early Tennessee explorer and pioneer James Robertson first build his homestead during 1770-1771 along the north side of the Watauga River at the mouth of the Doe River. Draper also recorded that the historic site of Fort Watauga was also located approximately four miles away from the John Sevier plantation that was located near the mouth of Stoney Creek, south of the Watauga River in Lynn Valley. 
 
Little detail is known of the original design of Fort Watauga. Ramsey described the fort as situated on a knoll, and Draper wrote that the fort was surrounded by an open glade within easy firing distance of the north bank of the Watauga River.

The 1974 excavations revealed that the fort had an irregular shape, and that it probably consisted of a group of cabins connected by a stockade. The shape of the reconstructed fort was based largely on the formations uncovered in these excavations, and its design was based on contemporary Appalachian frontier forts, which typically consisted of log structures (some with overhanging second stories) and a stockade of sharpened poles surrounding a  courtyard.

References

External links
Sycamore Shoals State Park
 Photographs from 2003 re-enactment

Watauga
North Carolina in the American Revolution
Tennessee in the American Revolution
Watauga
Buildings and structures in Carter County, Tennessee
18th century Cherokee history
Pre-statehood history of Tennessee
Elizabethton, Tennessee